Orlando Early (born November 27, 1967) is an American men's college basketball coach.  He was most recently an assistant coach at North Carolina State University under head coach Mark Gottfried until Gottfried was let go at the end of the 2016–17 season.

From 2005 to 2010, he served as head men's basketball coach at the University of Louisiana at Monroe. Early has also served as an assistant men's basketball coach at the University of South Carolina and the University of Alabama.

Head coaching record

References

1967 births
Living people
Alabama Crimson Tide men's basketball coaches
American men's basketball coaches
American men's basketball players
Basketball coaches from Virginia
Basketball players from Virginia
Charlotte 49ers men's basketball coaches
Gardner–Webb Runnin' Bulldogs men's basketball coaches
Gardner–Webb Runnin' Bulldogs men's basketball players
Louisiana–Monroe Warhawks men's basketball coaches
NC State Wolfpack men's basketball coaches
People from Lebanon, Virginia
Western Carolina Catamounts men's basketball coaches